The canton of Montrichard Val de Cher (before 2021: Montrichard) is an administrative division of the Loir-et-Cher department, central France. Its borders were modified at the French canton reorganisation which came into effect in March 2015. Its seat is in Montrichard Val de Cher.

It consists of the following communes:
 
Chissay-en-Touraine
Choussy
Le Controis-en-Sologne (partly)
Couddes
Faverolles-sur-Cher
Fresnes
Monthou-sur-Cher
Montrichard Val de Cher
Oisly
Pontlevoy
Saint-Georges-sur-Cher
Saint-Julien-de-Chédon
Sassay
Vallières-les-Grandes

References

Cantons of Loir-et-Cher